This list of U.S. states and territories by educational attainment covers the 50 U.S. states, the District of Columbia, and the territory of Puerto Rico and their populations' educational attainment for all people of at least 25 years of age. The four other inhabited U.S. territories (American Samoa, Guam, the Northern Mariana Islands, and the U.S. Virgin Islands) are listed separately. 

The data source for the main list is the U.S. Census Bureau's American Community Survey in 2021. The data source for the territories table is from 2010 U.S. Census Bureau data, because those territories are excluded from the American Community Survey. The American Community Survey is a large demographic survey collected throughout the year using mailed questionnaires, telephone interviews, and visits from Census Bureau field representatives to about 3.5 million household addresses annually, regardless of their legal immigration status. The survey does not measure graduation rates from different educational institutions, but instead, it measures the percentage of adult residents with a high school diploma.

Overall, 89.3% of Americans over the age of 25 had graduated from high school in 2021, with the highest level found in the state of Vermont at 94.5% and the lowest in the state of California at 84.4%. In Puerto Rico, the proportion was even lower, though, at 79.6%. 

34.9% of Americans over the age of 25 had educational attainment of having a bachelor's degree or higher in 2019. The state with the highest percentage of people having a bachelor's degree or higher educational attainment was Massachusetts at 46.6%, and the lowest was West Virginia at 24.1%. The District of Columbia had a percentage significantly higher than that of any U.S. state at 63.0%.

Advanced Degrees, such as Master's Degrees and Doctorates were held by 13.7% of Americans at least 25 years old in 2019. Advanced Degrees were most common in Massachusetts, with 21.3% of Massachusetts residents holding an advanced degree of any type in 2019, and they were least common in Mississippi, with 9.3% of Mississippi residents holding an advanced degree. The District of Columbia had a percentage of 37.8%, higher than that of any state, while in the Commonwealth of Puerto Rico, 7.9% of Americans had an advanced degree, a proportion lower than any state in the U.S.

As of the 2010 census, four U.S. territories (American Samoa, Guam, the Northern Mariana Islands, and the U.S. Virgin Islands) had educational attainment numbers below every U.S. state (and the District of Columbia). In the U.S. Virgin Islands, 68.9% had attained a high school degree or higher; in American Samoa, 9.9% had attained a bachelor's degree or higher.

List 

In the list below, one can find the population in each state and territory of the U.S. who has attained a specific education level (out of people 25 years or over), and the percentage of the population who has attained that education level. The list is initially sorted in Alphabetical order but one can click the table headers to sort by any column.

U.S. territories 

Below is a table of the educational attainment of four U.S. territories (American Samoa, Guam, the Northern Mariana Islands, and the U.S. Virgin Islands. The data in the table below is from the 2010 census because these territories are not included in the American Community Survey. Puerto Rico is not included in this table because Puerto Rico is included in the American Community Survey (with the name "Puerto Rico Community Survey") — Puerto Rico is included in the table above.

The data below is for people 25 years and older.

Maps

See also 

Education in the United States
High School in the United States
Colleges in the United States
Universities in the United States
High School Diploma
Bachelor's Degree
Master's Degree

References 

Educational Attainment
Attainment
Educational Attainment